Alba de Yeltes is a village and municipality in the province of Salamanca, western Spain, part of the autonomous community of Castile and León.

In 2016 the municipality had a population of 233.

The municipality is bordered on the north by Castraz, on the east by Aldehuela de Yeltes, on the south by Dios le Guarde, on the southwest by Tenebrón, on the west by Ciudad Rodrigo, and on the northwest by Sancti-Spíritus.

References

Municipalities in the Province of Salamanca